Kemény or Kemeny is a Hungarian surname, and may refer to:

 Dénes Kemény (b. 1954), former Hungarian water polo player
 Emil Kemény (1860–1925), Hungarian-American chess master
 Ferenc Kemény (1917–2008), also known as Francis Kemeni or Franz Kemeny, Hungarian translator
 Gábor Kemény (politician, 1910–1946), Hungarian politician who served as Minister of Foreign Affairs, 1944–1945
 János Kemény (disambiguation) - several people with the name János Kemény or its anglicization, John Kemeny
 Lajos Kemény (b. 1959), Hungarian physician, dermatologist, professor of Medicine
 Rudolf Kemény (1871-1945), Hungarian violinist and violin teacher
 Zoltán Kemény (1907-1965), Hungarian sculptor
 Zsigmond Kemény (1814–1875), Hungarian author

Kemény (Kemen, Kemyn, Kemynus) was also a former given name in medieval Hungary.  Notable people with the given name include:
 Kemény, son of Lawrence, 13th-century Hungarian lord

See also
List of titled noble families in the Kingdom of Hungary

Hungarian-language surnames